The child survival revolution (also called the child survival and development revolution) was an effort started by UNICEF (but joined by others) to reduce child mortality in the developing world. The effort lasted from 1982 to the 1990s, and generally coincides with James P. Grant's tenure as executive director of UNICEF (1980–1995). The child survival revolution included various programs and conferences, including the World Summit for Children in 1990.

Rather than treating child mortality as a measurement of development, the effort sought to directly reduce child mortality as a way toward development.

Although the revolution was started by UNICEF, other organizations, including the Rockefeller Foundation, UNDP, the World Bank, and WHO joined; thus the revolution is sometimes called "a grand alliance for children". The revolution was analogized with the Green Revolution by James Grant.

Timeline

Results and reception
The initial reaction to Grant's announcement of the child survival revolution was overwhelmingly negative due to several reasons, including practical reasons, e.g., the money and infrastructure to support Grant's plans not existing.

It is estimated that the child vaccination increased worldwide from 20% in 1982(?) to 80% in 1990 because of the child survival revolution.

Writing in 1990, D. A. Henderson noted that although "dramatic progress" had been made because of the child survival revolution, the results were still "little-appreciated".

The child survival revolution is estimated to have saved the lives of 25 million children.

Focus areas
The genesis of the Child Survival Revolution can be traced to 1973 when James P. Grant, gave his annual lecture at Johns Hopkins University's School of Public Health. In reviewing research findings of Prof Carl E. Taylor Grant grasped how the collective package from Taylor's Narangwal research (childhood pneumonia, oral rehydration therapy, neonatal tetanus, family planning) served as a parallel to The Green Revolution, saying "we can now start to talk about a Child Survival Revolution!"   Grant had earlier been Deputy Director of USAID, and in that role had been an early and strong backer of The Green Revolution, a global effort that dramatically raised global food supply through a package of agricultural innovations (new seed types, fertilizer, irrigation, pesticides, and mechanization). Grant grasped that it was the synergy that came through a package of interventions that would allow children to survive,

For much of the child survival revolution, James Grant and UNICEF adopted a strategy known as GOBI-FFF, a form of selective primary healthcare:

Of these, "immunization and ORT were seen as the 'twin-engines' of the child survival revolution".

After 1986, when studies by Alfred Sommer and others were published, vitamin A administration also became a focus.

Organizations involved
Although the revolution was started by UNICEF, other organizations were involved.

 Rockefeller Foundation
 United Nations Development Programme (UNDP)
 World Bank
 World Health Organization (WHO)
 Rotary International pledged to raise $120 million.

Use of mass media
UNICEF took advantage of the growing levels of basic education and access to television and radio to generate support for the child survival revolution through persuasion.

James Grant also "persuaded many heads of state to get personally involved in their national programmes for children, for example in their immunization by being photographed giving polio drops to a baby". Several figures from film and sports, like Audrey Hepburn, Liv Ullmann, and Peter Ustinov also participated in the UNICEF Goodwill Ambassador program.

See also
 Timeline of global health
 Malthusianism

References

Global health